Aleksandr Mikhaylovich Alfyorov (born 2 November 1962) is a Russian professional football manager and a former player. He is an assistant coach of FC Yenisey Krasnoyarsk.

Honours
 Russian Second Division, Zone East best coach: 2010.

External links
 

1962 births
People from Buryatia
Living people
Soviet footballers
Russian footballers
Association football forwards
FC Zvezda Irkutsk players
Changsha Ginde players
FC Sakhalin Yuzhno-Sakhalinsk players
FC Yenisey Krasnoyarsk players
FC Iskra Smolensk players
Russian expatriate footballers
Expatriate footballers in China
Russian football managers
FC Yenisey Krasnoyarsk managers
Sportspeople from Buryatia